The Battle of Posolskeya, the last engagement of the Allied intervention to involve American forces, occurred on 8 January 1920, after U.S. troops were surprise attacked by Cossacks loyal to the Russian SFSR.

Battle

On January 8, 1920, the announcement was made that the American Expeditionary Force Siberia would be withdrawn from Russia. The following day, around 80 Cossacks and an armored train attacked a much smaller platoon of M Company, 27th Infantry, which managed to capture most of the attacking force while leaving the rest dead. Subsequently, the withdrawal of the expeditionary force continued as planned with no further obstructions.

References

1920 in Russia
Battles of the Russian Civil War involving the United States
20th-century military history of the United States
Battles of the Russian Civil War
January 1920 events